The following is a list of programs currently, formerly, or soon to be broadcast on either ESPN, ESPN2 or ESPN on ABC.

Currently broadcast by ESPN

News / analysis
Baseball Tonight (since 1990)
College Football Final (since 1999)
College Football Live (since 2007)
College Football Scoreboard (since 1999)
College GameDay basketball (since 2005)
College GameDay football (since 1987)
College Football Final (since 2005)
E:60 (since 2007)
 ESPN FC (since 2013)
Monday Night Countdown (since 1993)
NBA Countdown (since 2002)
NBA Today (since 2021)
NFL Live (since 1998)
NFL Matchup (since 1993)
NFL Primetime (since 1987)
 NFL Rewind (since 2019)
SportsCenter (since 1979)
Sunday NFL Countdown (since 1985)

Talk / debate

Around the Horn (since 2002)
Get Up! (since 2018)
First Take (since 2007)
Pardon the Interruption (since 2001)
This Just In with Max Kellerman (since 2021)

Original series
30 for 30 (since 2009)

Game telecasts
 ACC Wednesday (since 2003)
 Big Monday (since 1987)
 ESPN College Football Primetime (Saturday) (since 1990)
 ESPN College Football Primetime (Thursday) (since 1997)
 ESPN Hockey Night (since 2021)
 ESPN Megacast (since 2006)
 ESPN2 College Football Friday Primetime (since 2004)
 ESPN2 College Football Saturday Primetime (since 1994)
 Monday Night Football (since 2006)
 Monday Night Football with Peyton and Eli (since 2021)
 NBA Friday (since 2002)
 NBA Wednesday (since 2002)
 Saturday Primetime (since 2005)
 Sunday Night Baseball (since 1990)
 Super Tuesday (since 1993)
 Throwdown Thursday (since 2003)
 Wednesday Night Hoops (since 2003)
 Wimbledon (since 2002)
 WNBA on ESPN (since 1997)

Formerly broadcast by ESPN

News / analysis
 Baseball 2Day (2000–)
 BassCenter (2003–2006)
 The Beat (2010-???)
 College Basketballs's Greatest Games (1995)
 College Football's Greatest Games (1995)
College GameNight: Midnight Madness (2007-???)
ESPN Hollywood (2005–2006)
MLS Extratime (2000-2001)
NASCAR Countdown (2007-2014)
NASCAR Now (2007–2014)
Nation's Business Today (1980–1991)
NFL32 (2004)
NHL 2Night (1995–2004)
RPM 2Night (1995–2003)
SpeedWeek (1984–1997)
SportsNite  (1993–1997)
The Trifecta (since 2005)
World Cup Live (2006-2014)
NFL Insiders (2013-2017)
 The Jump (2016-2021)

Talk / debate
Always Late with Katie Nolan (2018–2020)
Cold Pizza (2003–2007)
The Fantasy Show (2006)
Jim Rome is Burning (2003–2012)
Highly Questionable (2011–2021)
Mike & Mike (2006–2017)
Best of Mike and Mike (2006–2017)
Olbermann (2013–2015)
Outside the Lines (1990–2022)
Outside the Lines Nightly (2003–2006)
Quite Frankly with Stephen A. Smith (2005–2007)
 SportsNight (1993–1997)
Talk2 (1993–1998)
Unscripted with Chris Connelly (2001–2002)
Up Close (1982–2001)
Winners Bracket (2010)
Barstool Van Talk (2017)
 Intentional Talk (2017–2018, produced by MLB Network)

Original series

2 Minute Drill (2000–2001)
 All American (TV series)
Battle of the Gridiron Stars (2005–06)
Beg, Borrow and Deal (2001–2002)
 Bill Walton's Long Strange Trip (2003)
Bonds on Bonds (2006)
Bound for Glory (2005)
The Bronx is Burning (2007)
The Captain (2022)
Cheap Seats (2004–2006)
The Contender (2005)
Dream Job (2004–2006)
 ESPN2 Block Party (since 2005)
ESPN2 Garage (since 2007)
Madden Nation (since 2006)
NBA Live: Bring It Home (since 2007)
The New American Sportsman (since 2006)
Free Agent (2005)
I'd Do Anything (2004–2005)
It's The Shoes
Knight School (2006)
The Last Dance (2020)
The Life
Nine for IX (2013)
Playmakers (2003)
Shaquille (2005)
Sportraits (1988)
Stump the Schwab (2004-2006)
 Teammates (since 2005)
The Wild Rules (2003-2004)
Tilt (2005)

Game telecasts
ESPN Arena Football Monday (1987-1988, 1992-2002, 2007-2008)
ESPN DayGame (1996-2006)
Drum Corps International (2005-2007)
ESPN National Hockey Night (1992-2004)
ESPN SpeedWorld (1979-2006)
MLS Soccer Saturday (1996-2006)
NASCAR on ESPN (1981-2000, 2007-2014)
NHRA (2001-2015)
Sunday Night Football (1987-2005)
Thursday Night Baseball (2003-2006)
Friday Night Fights (1998-2015)
IndyCar Series on ESPN (1997-2008)
NTRA Super Saturdays
Professional Bowlers Association (1985-2018)
Monday Night Baseball (1992-2021)
Wednesday Night Baseball (1990-2021)
MLS on ESPN (1996-2022)

Other
BodyShaping (1990–1998)

Professional Wrestling
AWA Championship Wrestling (1985–1990)
GWF Global SuperCard Wrestling (1991–1993)
Legends of WCCW / USWA (1988-1991)
World Class Championship Wrestling / USWA Wrestling (1986–1991)

Movies
3: The Dale Earnhardt Story (2004)
Black Magic (2008)
Code Breakers (2005)
Four Minutes (2005)
Hustle (2004)
The Junction Boys (2002)
Mr. and Mrs. America (2007)
Once in a Lifetime: The Extraordinary Story of the New York Cosmos (2006)
Ruffian (2007)
A Season on the Brink (2002)
Through the Fire (2006)

See also
ESPN

References

External links
ESPN TV website

 
Programs broadcast by ESPN